The Shire of Victoria Plains is a local government area in the Wheatbelt region of Western Australia, about  north of the state capital, Perth.

History

The Victoria Plains Road District was gazetted on 24 January 1871 covering an area extending as far north as Carnamah and east to the South Australian border. These areas gradually obtained their own local government over the next 40 years.

The Melbourne Road District separated on 10 February 1887.

On 11 December 1908, Moora Road District was gazetted and also separated.

As a result of the WA Local Government Act 1960, all remaining road districts became shires, including the Shire of Victoria Plains, on 1 July 1961.

Wards
The shire is divided into four wards.

 West Ward (three councillors)
 Central Ward (two councillors)
 East Ward (two councillors)
 South Ward (two councillors)

Towns and localities
The towns and localities of the Shire of Victoria Plains with population and size figures based on the most recent Australian census:

Presidents

Population

Heritage-listed places

As of 2023, 206 places are heritage-listed in the Shire of Victoria Plains, of which five are on the State Register of Heritage Places.

References

External links

 

 
Victoria Plains